The 3rd BET Awards took place at the Kodak Theatre in Los Angeles, California on June 24, 2003. The awards recognized Americans in music, acting, sports, and other fields of entertainment over the past year. Comedian Mo'Nique hosted the event for the first time.

Awards and nominations
Best Female R&B Artist
 India Arie
 Amerie
 Vivian Green
 Heather Headley
 Erykah Badu

Best Male R&B Artist
 Jaheim
 R. Kelly
 Musiq Soulchild
 Justin Timberlake
 Ginuwine

Best Female Hip-Hop Artist
 Missy Elliott
 Eve
 Lil' Kim
 Ms. Jade
 Trina

Best Male Hip-Hop Artist
 50 Cent
 Baby
 Eminem
 Jay Z
 Nelly
 Snoop Dogg

Best New Artist
 50 Cent
 Floetry
 Heather Headley
 Sean Paul
 Justin Timberlake

Best Group
 B2K
 Clipse
 Mary Mary
 Floetry
 The Roots

Best Gospel Artist
 Yolanda Adams
 Donnie McClurkin
 Kirk Franklin
 Tonéx
 Smokie Norful

Best Actress
 Queen Latifah
 Gabrielle Union
 Halle Berry
 Nicole Ari Parker
 Sanaa Lathan

Best Actor
 Derek Luke
 Nick Cannon
 Mos Def
 Samuel L. Jackson
 Denzel Washington

Best Female Athlete of the Year
 Serena Williams
 Sheryl Swoopes
 Lisa Leslie
 Laila Ali
 Venus Williams

Best Male Athlete of the Year
 Kobe Bryant
 Tiger Woods
 Barry Bonds
 Allen Iverson
 Tracy McGrady

Video of the Year
 Erykah Badu for "Love of My Life (An Ode to Hip-Hop)" featuring Common
 B2K for "Girlfriend"
 Missy Elliott for "Work It"
 Eminem for "Lose Yourself"
 Nelly for "Hot in Herre"

Viewer's Choice
 B2K for "Bump, Bump, Bump featuring P. Diddy
 50 Cent for "In da Club"
 R. Kelly for "Ignition (Remix)"
 Missy Elliott for "Work It"
 Erykah Badu for "Love of My Life (An Ode to Hip-Hop)" featuring Common

Best Collaboration
 Snoop Dogg for "Beautiful" featuring Pharrell Williams & Charlie Wilson
 Nelly for "Dilemma" featuring Kelly Rowland
 Erykah Badu for "Love of My Life (An Ode to Hip-Hop)" featuring Common
 Jay Z for "'03 Bonnie & Clyde" featuring Beyoncé
 Missy Elliott for "Gossip Folks" featuring Ludacris & Ms. Jade

Lifetime Achievement Award
 James Brown (awarded by Michael Jackson)

Humanitarian Award
 Magic Johnson

References

BET Awards